Markel Areitio Cedrún (born 7 September 1996) is a Spanish footballer who plays for CD Izarra as a goalkeeper.

Club career
Born in Iurreta, Biscay, Basque Country, Areitio played youth football for Iurretako KT and Athletic Bilbao. He made his debut as a senior for the latter's farm team in 2014, in Tercera División.

On 8 June 2015, Areitio was released by Athletic, and subsequently joined SCD Durango also in the fourth division. On 13 July of the following year he moved to fellow league team CD Vitoria, SD Eibar's reserves.

On 17 September 2016, Areitio was called up to the main squad for a La Liga match against Sevilla FC, as starter Asier Riesgo was suspended. He made his professional debut just hours later, coming on as a second-half substitute for Bebé in a 1–1 draw at the Ipurua Municipal Stadium after Yoel was sent off.

Personal life
Areitio comes from a family of goalkeepers: his grandfather's brother Carmelo Cedrún was a Spanish international, while his uncle Andoni Cedrún appeared in more than 300 league matches for Real Zaragoza. Both also represented Athletic as a youth.

References

External links

1996 births
Living people
People from Durangaldea
Spanish footballers
Footballers from the Basque Country (autonomous community)
Association football goalkeepers
La Liga players
Segunda División B players
Tercera División players
CD Basconia footballers
CD Vitoria footballers
SD Eibar footballers
CD Izarra footballers
Athletic Bilbao footballers
Sportspeople from Biscay